Violin Sonata No. 18 in G Major (K 301/293a) was composed by Wolfgang Amadeus Mozart in March 1778 in Mannheim, Germany and was first published in the same year as part of Mozart's Opus 1 collection, which was dedicated to Maria Elisabeth, Electress of the Palatinate and are consequently known as the Palatine Sonatas.

The work consists of two movements:

References

External links 
 Violin Sonata No. 18 in G, K. 301/293a Free Scores from the International Music Score Library Project

301
1778 compositions
Compositions in G major
Music dedicated to nobility or royalty